William Downs is an artist. He was born in Greenville, South Carolina, and lives in Atlanta, Georgia.

Exhibitions

2019   a soft place to land, E.C. Lina Gallery, Los Angeles, CA
2019   standing on the verge of..., GrizzlyGrizzly, Philadelphia, PA
2018   Inhuman, Sandler Hudson Gallery, Atlanta, GA
2018   sometimes it hurts, Contemporary Art Museum St. Louis, St. Louis, MO 
2016   aimless revery, The Fuel and Lumber Company, Birmingham, AL, Slag Gallery, NY
2011   at ease, Parker Jones Gallery, Los Angeles, CA
2009   a world I never made, Slag Gallery, New York, NY
2008   fly away fly away, Artspace, New Haven, CT
2003	Drawings, Tevis County Gallery, Westminster, MD
2002	Drawings 2001–2002, Mission Space, Baltimore, MD
1999	Broken Ladders, Chattahoochee Valley Art Museum, La Grange, GA
1998	Drawings, ASIS Alternative Space, Atlanta, GA
1998	Hands and Feet, Gallery 307, Decatur, GA
1997	Broken Ladders, Georgia South Western University, Fine Arts Center Gallery LaGrange, GA
1994	Etchings and Monoprints, The Equitable Building, Atlanta, GA
1993	Etchings, Yin and Yang Gallery, Atlanta, GA

References

Further reading 
Cotter, Christina. "Exquisite Corpses Abound in William Downs & Brooke Pickett's Collaboration," ArtsAtl, April 27, 2012
Holte, Michael Ned. "'ACP': Parker Jones," Artforum, March, 2011
Bowers, Jessica. “17th National Drawing and Print Competitive Exhibition,” Baltimore City Paper, April 12, 2006
Tanguy, Sarah. "Baltimore 'Model Home' Artscape," Sculpture Magazine, Vol. 23 No. 6, July/August 2004
Bowers, Jessica. “Drawing No Conclusions,” Baltimore City Paper, August 6, 2003

Year of birth missing (living people)
Living people
People from Greenville, South Carolina
Artists from New York City
Atlanta College of Art alumni